Martin Scott (born 5 July 1966) is a former Scotland international rugby union player.

Rugby Union career

Amateur career

He played for Dunfermline.

He then moved to play for Edinburgh Academicals.

Provincial and professional career

He was capped by North and Midlands.

When the game turned professional, he played for Orrell in England.

He played for the Combined Scottish Districts side in 1996.

International career

He was capped twice by Scotland 'B', playing against Ireland 'B' at the end of 1991, and against France 'B' in 1992 - which proved the 'B' side's last match.

He received his first full senior cap in 1992 against Australia. It proved his only full cap.

He was capped twice by Scotland 'A' from 1993 to 1995.

References

1966 births
Living people
Dunfermline RFC players
Scotland international rugby union players
Scottish rugby union players
North and Midlands players
Orrell R.U.F.C. players
Edinburgh Academicals rugby union players
Rugby union players from Falkirk
Scotland 'B' international rugby union players
Scotland 'A' international rugby union players
Scottish Districts (combined) players
Rugby union hookers